Barrie Michael Meissner (born July 26, 1946) is a Canadian former ice hockey player. He played 6 games in the National Hockey League with the Minnesota North Stars during the 1967–68 and 1968–69 seasons. The rest of his career, which lasted from 1967 to 1973, was spent in the minor leagues. Barrie is the brother of Dick Meissner.

Career statistics

Regular season and playoffs

References

External links
 

1946 births
Living people
Canadian ice hockey left wingers
Cleveland Barons (1937–1973) players
Ice hockey people from Saskatchewan
Iowa Stars (CHL) players
Jacksonville Barons players
Memphis South Stars players
Minnesota North Stars players
Omaha Knights (CHL) players
People from Unity, Saskatchewan
Regina Pats players
Seattle Totems (WHL) players